June 15 - Eastern Orthodox Church calendar - June 17

All fixed commemorations below celebrated on June 29 by Orthodox Churches on the Old Calendar.

For June 16th, Orthodox Churches on the Old Calendar commemorate the Saints listed on June 3.

Saints
 Hieromartyr Mark, Bishop of Apollonias, nephew of the Apostle Barnabas (1st century)
 Martyr Elappas.
 Five Martyrs of Nicomedia, by the sword.
 Forty Martyrs of Rome, by fire.
 Hieromartyr Tigrius, Priest, and Martyr Eutropius, Reader, of Constantinople (404)  (see also: January 12)
 Saint Mnemonios, Bishop of Amathus in Cyprus (4th century)
 Saint Tikhon of Amathus in Cyprus, Bishop and Wonderworker (425)

Pre-Schism Western saints
 Saints Ferreolus, Priest, and Ferrutio, Deacon, brothers from Asia Minor (c. 212)
 Saint Similien of Nantes (Sambin), third Bishop of Nantes in France, confessor; St Gregory of Tours testified to his holiness. (310)
 Saints Actinea and Graecina, both martyrs, the former was beheaded in Volterra in Italy under Diocletian (4th century)
 Saints Aureus of Mainz, Justina and Companions, during an invasion of the Huns (c. 436 or 451)
 Saint Simplicius of Bourges, Bishop of Bourges in France, he defended the Church against the Arian Visigoths (477)
 Saint Cettin (Cethagh), a disciple of St Patrick of Ireland and consecrated bishop by him (5th century)
 Saint Berthaldus (Bertaud), a hermit in the Ardennes in France, who was ordained priest by St Remigius of Reims (c. 540)
 Saint Aurelianus of Arles, Bishop of Arles in France (c. 550)
 Venerable Colman McRoi, a deacon who was a disciple of St Columba, he founded a monastery at Reachrain, now Lambay Island, near Dublin in Ireland (6th century)
 Saint Curig, Bishop of Llanbadarn in Wales, where several churches are dedicated to him (6th century)
 Saints Felix and Maurus, father and son who lived as hermits at what is now called San Felice near Narni in central Italy (6th century)
 Venerable Ismael (Isfael), a disciple of St Teilo in Wales, he was consecrated Bishop of Menevia by him (6th century)

Post-Schism Orthodox saints
 Venerable Sabbas of Moscow, Monk of Andronikov Monastery, Moscow (1378)
 Venerable Tikhon of Kaluga, or Medyn, founder of the St. Tikhon of Kaluga Monastery (1492)<ref>"Venerable Tikhon of Kaluga Or Medin. OCA - Lives of the Saints.</ref>
 Saint Tikhon of Lukhov, Kostroma (1503)Great Synaxaristes:  Ὁ Ὅσιος Τύχων ὁ Θαυματουργός ὁ ἐν τῷ Λούκωφ τῆς Ρωσίας. 16 ΙΟΥΝΙΟΥ. ΜΕΓΑΣ ΣΥΝΑΞΑΡΙΣΤΗΣ.
 Martyr Kaikhosro of Georgia, monk, of Jerusalem, under Abbas I of Persia (1612)St. Kaikhosro the Georgian. OCA - Lives of the Saints.
 Saint Tikhon of Krestogorsk, founder of Krestogorsk Monastery, Vologda (17th century)
 Venerable Moses of Optina, founder and archimandrite of the Skete of St. John the Baptist (1862)Great Synaxaristes:  Ὁ Ὅσιος Μωυσῆς τῆς Ὄπτινα. 16 ΙΟΥΝΙΟΥ. ΜΕΓΑΣ ΣΥΝΑΞΑΡΙΣΤΗΣ.

New martyrs and confessors
 New Hieromartyr Hermogenes (Dolganyov), Bishop of Tobolsk, and those with him (1918):Great Synaxaristes:  Ὁ Ἅγιος Ἑρμογένης ὁ Ἱερομάρτυρας Ἐπίσκοπος Τομπὸλσκ Ρωσίας. 16 ΙΟΥΝΙΟΥ. ΜΕΓΑΣ ΣΥΝΑΞΑΡΙΣΤΗΣ.
 Priests Ephrem Dolganev, Michael Makarov and Peter Korelin.
 Martyr Constantine Miniatov.

Other commemorations
 Uncovering of the relics (1200) of Venerable Theodore the Sykeote, Bishop of Anastasiopolis in Galatia (613)Great Synaxaristes:  Ἀνακομιδὴ Τιμίων Λειψάνων Ὁσίου Θεοδώρου τοῦ Συκεώτου. 16 ΙΟΥΝΙΟΥ. ΜΕΓΑΣ ΣΥΝΑΞΑΡΙΣΤΗΣ.
 Repose of Elder Gerasimus of St. Tikhon of Kaluga Monastery (1898)
 Repose of Righteous Maria (1943), disciple of St. Paul of Taganrog.
 Translation of the relics (2002) of St. Theophan the Recluse, Bishop of Tambov (1894) 29 июня (16 июня). Православная Энциклопедия под редакцией Патриарха Московского и всея Руси Кирилла (электронная версия). (Orthodox Encyclopedia - Pravenc.ru).

Icon gallery

Notes

References

Sources
 June 16/29. Orthodox Calendar (PRAVOSLAVIE.RU).
 June 29 / June 16. HOLY TRINITY RUSSIAN ORTHODOX CHURCH (A parish of the Patriarchate of Moscow).
 June 16. OCA - The Lives of the Saints.
 The Autonomous Orthodox Metropolia of Western Europe and the Americas (ROCOR). St. Hilarion Calendar of Saints for the year of our Lord 2004. St. Hilarion Press (Austin, TX). p. 44.
 The Sixteenth Day of the Month of June. Orthodoxy in China.
 June 16. Latin Saints of the Orthodox Patriarchate of Rome.
 The Roman Martyrology. Transl. by the Archbishop of Baltimore. Last Edition, According to the Copy Printed at Rome in 1914. Revised Edition, with the Imprimatur of His Eminence Cardinal Gibbons. Baltimore: John Murphy Company, 1916. pp. 175–176.
 Rev. Richard Stanton. A Menology of England and Wales, or, Brief Memorials of the Ancient British and English Saints Arranged According to the Calendar, Together with the Martyrs of the 16th and 17th Centuries. London: Burns & Oates, 1892. p. 271.
Greek Sources
 Great Synaxaristes:  16 ΙΟΥΝΙΟΥ. ΜΕΓΑΣ ΣΥΝΑΞΑΡΙΣΤΗΣ.
  Συναξαριστής. 16 Ιουνίου. ECCLESIA.GR. (H ΕΚΚΛΗΣΙΑ ΤΗΣ ΕΛΛΑΔΟΣ). 
  16 Ιουνίου. Αποστολική Διακονία της Εκκλησίας της Ελλάδος (Apostoliki Diakonia of the Church of Greece).
  16/06/2018.'' Ορθόδοξος Συναξαριστής. 
Russian Sources
  29 июня (16 июня). Православная Энциклопедия под редакцией Патриарха Московского и всея Руси Кирилла (электронная версия). (Orthodox Encyclopedia - Pravenc.ru).
  16 июня по старому стилю / 29 июня по новому стилю. Русская Православная Церковь - Православный церковный календарь на 2017 год.
  16 июня (ст.ст.) 29 июня 2014 (нов. ст.). Русская Православная Церковь Отдел внешних церковных связей. (DECR).

June in the Eastern Orthodox calendar